Oneco Township is located in Stephenson County, Illinois. As of the 2010 census, its population was 1,331 and it contained 587 housing units. The village of Orangeville, and the unincorporated community of Oneco are located in this township.

Geography
Oneco is Township 29 North, Range 7 and 8 (part) East of the Fourth Principal Meridian.

Demographics

References

External links
City-data.com
Stephenson County Official Site

Townships in Stephenson County, Illinois
Townships in Illinois